The 2017 SMU Mustangs women's soccer team represented Southern Methodist University during the 2017 NCAA Division I women's soccer season. The regular season began on August 18 and concluded on October 26. It was the program's 24th season fielding a women's varsity soccer team, and their 5th season in the AAC. The 2017 season was Chris Petrucelli's sixth year as head coach for the program.

Roster

Schedule 

|-
!colspan=6 style=""| Non-conference regular season
|-

|-
!colspan=6 style=""| American Athletic Conference regular season
|-

|-
!colspan=6 style=""| American Athletic Conference Tournament
|-

|-

References

2017 American Athletic Conference women's soccer season
2017 in sports in Texas
SMU Mustangs women's soccer